Mikael Johansson (born 1960) is a Swedish Green Party politician and a member of the Riksdag since 1998. In the Riksdag, Johansson was a member of the Transport Committee 1998–2005, the Constitution Committee 2006–2010 and the Riksdag Election Committee 2006–2010. He was also a substitute member of the Finance Committee, the Defence Committee, the Constitutional Committee, the Culture Committee, the Law Committee, the Environment and Agriculture Committee and the Transport Committee.

References

Members of the Riksdag from the Green Party
Living people
1960 births
Members of the Riksdag 1998–2002
Members of the Riksdag 2002–2006
Members of the Riksdag 2006–2010
20th-century Swedish politicians
21st-century Swedish politicians